Vladimír Jiránek (June 6, 1938 – November 6, 2012) was a Czech illustrator, film director and cartoonist.

Information
Jiránek was born in Hradec Králové.  In 1962 he graduated from the Faculty of Arts of Charles University in Prague, where he studied journalism, but he worked as a freelance illustrator and illustrator throughout his life.  He closely cooperated with magazines (e.g. Mladý svět, Vesmír, Technický magazín). After the Velvet revolution he joined Lidové noviny. In 1993 he moved to Mladá fronta DNES and then back to Lidové noviny. His cartoons also appear in Reflex and several other magazines.  He died, aged 74, in Prague.

Animated films (selection)
Pat & Mat (1976)
Co jsme udělali slepicím (1977) co-director, story, illustrations
Bob a Bobek, králíci z klobouku (1977)

Books
Anekdoty pro civilizaci (Anecdotes for civilization, 1977)
Běžte a milujte se (1987)
Bob a Bobek, králíci z klobouku (Bob and Bobek, 1988)
Knížka pro snílky (A book for dreamers, 1989)
Události (Events, 1990)
Doktorská knížka (1997)
(Ne)kuřácká knížka (Book for (non)smokers, 2000)
To byla léta devadesátá (2000)

References

External links
Official site

Czech animators
Czech animated film directors
Czech illustrators
Czech cartoonists
Stop motion animators
1938 births
2012 deaths
People from Hradec Králové
Recipients of Medal of Merit (Czech Republic)
Charles University alumni